Christmas: A Ghostly Gathering is the eighteenth album by the gothic horror instrumental band, Midnight Syndicate. The album features a mix of re-imagined Christmas carols and original compositions in a style similar to the band's other gothic, paranormal, and Halloween-themed releases. Midnight Syndicate founder and composer, Edward Douglas, said it's one of his favorite albums they've ever created.

Background and album information 
In an interview with InPark Magazine a year after the album's release, composer, Edward Douglas said this:  A Christmas album with a Midnight Syndicate twist is something we’d wanted to do for years. The traditions of Christmas as celebrated around the world are seeped in the supernatural and in folk tales passed down from generation to generation. Those stories and traditions were a tremendous source of inspiration for the music on this album. Additionally, the haunting quality to some of the older carols lent themselves well to what we wanted to do. It was extremely important to both Gavin and myself that we be very respectful of the music and the traditions of holidays. I like to think of this album as hauntingly beautiful as opposed to very dark. We have some fun taking a few uptempo tracks down a creepier path but it’s all done carefully so as not to go too far. I think that is one of the reasons this album has appealed to so many different people.

In an interview with Gothic Beauty, Gavin Goszka said the band wanted to do more than take Christmas songs and "redo them in minor keys", adding many of the songs were completely re-imagined and that the band's musical palette had never been more varied.

The album included four original tracks: Night of the Krampus, Little Helpers, Winter Storm, and Christmas at Midnight. The track, Little Helpers featured vocal artist, Dennis Carter Jr., who previously portrayed, Laughing Denny in the band's Carnival Arcane album. The album artwork was created by French illustrator and matte painter, Pascal Casolari.

Reception 
Aaron Von Lupton of the horror magazine, Rue Morgue, called the album's darkness "more subtle and genuine" than he typically saw when horror was mixed with a Christmas setting, adding that the holiday music was "redone with Midnight Syndicate's unique stamp, reflecting beauty, fantasy, and the supernatural." On his America's Most Haunted website, Blogcritics founder, Eric Olsen praised the album's roots in the Victorian era tradition of telling ghost stories during Christmas. Justin Dark of the horror website, Dread Central called the album "a creepy and dark tribute to (Christmas)" and a "masterful collection of holiday spooky," while lamenting that some of the original songs got lost in their new "comprehensive" rearrangements. Several horror blog sites like Mr. Fright's and Gross Movie Reviews as well as haunted house-related YouTuber page, DEAD with Dave, praised the album's appeal to fans of horror while Sue Granquist of the fantasy and role-playing game-related online publication, Black Gate Magazine, called the album "charmingly haunting." While giving the album a "7 out of 10," Outburn Music Magazine'''s Kevin Stewart-Panko added "if you want to put a dampened pallor on holiday cheer, here's some ammunition."

 Other appearances 
In 2017, Edward Douglas' version of Dance of the Sugar Plum Fairy was featured in the SyFy television series, Happy! in the episode When Christmas Was Christmas.

 Track listing 

 Personnel 
Edward Douglas – composer
Gavin Goszka – composer
Dennis Carter Jr. - voice actor on Little Helpers''

Production 
Producers – Edward Douglas, Gavin Goszka
Mastering - Gavin Goszka 
Cover art - Pascal Casolari
Design - Brainstorm Design Group
Band Photography - Steven Franczek
Band Photography Design - Topher Adam

References

Midnight Syndicate albums
2015 Christmas albums
Christmas albums by American artists
Rock Christmas albums